Fowler v Padget (1798) 7 Term Rep 509; 101 ER 1103 is an old UK insolvency law case, which concerned what amounted to an act of bankruptcy.

Facts
Fowler claimed that Padget had unlawfully broken into his house, trespassed and converted his goods. Padget claimed that he was justified in doing so, because under the Act, 13 Eliz. c. 7, Fowler had committed an act of bankruptcy. Fowler had gone from his house in Manchester, where he worked as a trader, to London because one of his creditors' business had been failing. During the ten days of his departure, Fowler's own creditors had called upon his house, and believed Fowler to have departed for fraudulent reasons under the Act of 1603, 1 Jac. 1, c. 15.

Judgment
Lord Kenyon held that there had been no act of bankruptcy, and Fowler's intention in leaving his house was not fraudulent. Under the Act, only intent to defraud creditors would amount to an Act of bankruptcy.

Ashurst J, Grose J and Lawrence J gave concurring opinions.

See also
UK insolvency law
UK bankruptcy law
History of bankruptcy law

Notes

Insolvency law of the United Kingdom